Lee Chong Cheng (born 16 November 1965 in Macau) is a member of the Legislative Assembly of Macau. Lee Chong Cheng was first elected through the Labor functional constituency representing Employees Association Joint Candidature Commission (CCCAE) later directly elected through the Geographical constituency.

Election results

See also
 List of members of the Legislative Assembly of Macau

References

1965 births
Living people
Cantonese people
Members of the Legislative Assembly of Macau
Union for Development politicians
Macau United Citizens Association politicians